"Hakuna matata" is a Swahili phrase, meaning "no trouble" or "no worries" and "take it easy". (literally hakuna: "there is no/there are no"; matata: "worries".) The 1994 Walt Disney Animation Studios animated film The Lion King brought the phrase to Western prominence in one of its most popular songs, in which it is translated as "no worries". The song is often heard at Disney's resorts, hotels, and amusement parks.

Boney M. song
In 1983, German group Boney M. released "Jambo—Hakuna Matata", an English-language version of the song Jambo Bwana by Kenyan group Them Mushrooms. Liz Mitchell provided the song's lead vocals, backed by Reggie Tsiboe, Frank Farian, Cathy Bartney, Madeleine Davis and Judy Cheeks. The single performed poorly, reaching number 48 in the German charts and causing it to be omitted from the group's seventh album Ten Thousand Lightyears, released in 1984.

The Lion King song

In 1994, the Walt Disney Feature Animation animated film The Lion King brought the phrase international recognition, featuring it prominently in the plot and devoting a song to it. A meerkat and a warthog, Timon and Pumbaa, teach Simba that he should forget his troubled past and live in the present. The song was written by Elton John (music) and Tim Rice (lyrics), who found the term in a Swahili phrasebook. It was nominated for Best Original Song at the 1995 Academy Awards, and was later ranked the 99th best song in movie history by the American Film Institute on a list of 100.

Controversy
In 2003, Disney was granted a trademark protecting the phrase from being used on clothing and footwear. Prior to the release of the 2019 Lion King remake, the trademark caused controversy in East Africa. More than 280,000 people have signed a petition on Change.org asking Disney to drop the trademark.

See also
 Ataraxia
 No worries
 Ubuntu philosophy

References

Swahili words and phrases
The Lion King (franchise)